Ivan Lendl was the defending champion, but lost in the semifinals this year.

Boris Becker won the tournament, beating Stefan Edberg in the final, 7–6, 6–1.

Seeds

  Ivan Lendl (semifinals)
  Boris Becker (champion)
  Stefan Edberg (final)
  Jimmy Connors (semifinals)
  Andrés Gómez (second round)
  David Pate (quarterfinals)
  Aaron Krickstein (second round)
  Ulf Stenlund (second round)

Draw

Finals

Top half

Bottom half

External links
 Main draw

1986 Grand Prix (tennis)
Tokyo Indoor